The Mihalarias Art Center was established in Kolonaki in the center of Athens, Greece in 1984. It went on to open other branches in the city, at the Kifissia Gallery and at the Art City in Malakassa.

Overview 
The gallery Mihalarias Art was officially opened in Kifissia in May 2005. Stavros Mihalarias, experienced in the establishment of art centers like the neo-classical houses in Athens and the contemporary Art City in Malakasa, renovated the listed building on Kifissias Avenue and Diligianni with the aim of creating a multifaced art gallery.

Built in the beginning of the 20th century, this building is a jewel in the center of Kifissia with an outside area designed to host exhibitions of sculpture. Paintings and sculptures by Greek and international artists of the 19th and 20th centuries, antiquities, icons and many other works of art are on permanent exhibition in its rooms. Periodical shows and exhibitions in collaboration with international galleries are also organized.

External links
 

Arts centres
Art museums established in 1984
1984 establishments in Greece
Art museums and galleries in Greece